The 2000 CAF Champions League Final was a football tie held over two legs in December 2000. Hearts of Oak of Ghana beat Espérance of Tunisia 5-2.

Qualified teams
In the following table, finals until 1996 were in the African Cup of Champions Club era, since 1997 were in the CAF Champions League era.

Venues

Stade El Menzah

Stade Olympique El Menzah is a multi-purpose stadium, located in the north of Tunis, Tunisia.

It is built to host the 1967 Mediterranean Games at the same time as the Olympic swimming pool and gymnasium. Since then, it is an integral part of Tunisia's main sports complex. Tunisia's three major football teams, ES Tunis, Club Africain and Stade Tunisien played their games there.
The stadium is completely renovated for the 1994 African Cup of Nations. It has a capacity of 39,858 seats. The VIP section consists of a grandstand and 2 salons that can accommodate 300 people in a "cocktail" configuration.

Ohene Djan Stadium

The Accra Sports Stadium, formerly named the Ohene Djan Stadium is a multi-use, 39,800  all-seater stadium in Accra. Ghana, mostly used for association football matches. It is also used for rugby union.

The stadium was inaugurated in 1952 by a football match played between Accra XI and Kumasi XI.

The stadium is also the home of one of Africa's most popular clubs, Hearts of Oak as well as Great Olympics, but Ghana's national team matches are sometimes played there.

During the 2000 African Cup of Nations in Ghana and Nigeria, the stadium hosted 9 matches, and was also the venue of the 1978 final.

Road to final

Format
The final was decided over two legs, with aggregate goals used to determine the winner. If the sides were level on aggregate after the second leg, the away goals rule would have been applied, and if still level, the tie would have proceeded directly to a penalty shootout (no extra time is played).

Matches

First leg

Second leg

Notes and references

Notes

References
 

Final
2000
December 2000 sports events in Africa
Caf Champions League Final 2000
Espérance ST matches
Accra Hearts of Oak S.C. matches